The R769 road is a regional road in Ireland, located in County Wexford. It forms the pre-bypass route of the N25 into Wexford town.

References

Regional roads in the Republic of Ireland
Roads in County Wexford